Neocyprideis timorensis is a species of Indo-Pacific ostracod that has existed since the Miocene.

Distribution
N. timorensis has been found in the waters of the Red Sea, Singapore and the western Malay Peninsula. It has also been found as a fossil in Upper Pliocene rocks from Timor and Miocene to Quaternary rocks in the Solomon Islands.

Taxonomic history
It was first discovered by George Stewardson Brady in 1880, but remained undescribed until E. C. Fyan formally described it in 1916. The name "Bishopina mozarti", published by Bonaduce, Masoli & Pugliese in 1976, is a junior subjective synonym of N. timorensis, and commemorates Wolfgang Amadeus Mozart.

References

Podocopida
Crustaceans described in 1916
Wolfgang Amadeus Mozart